Joseph or Joe Frank may refer to:

Joseph Frank (cricketer) (1857–1940), English amateur first-class cricketer
Joseph Frank (physician) (1771–1842), German physician
Joseph Frank (promoter) (1900–1952), American promoter known as J.L. Frank, primarily in country music
Joseph Frank (writer) (1918–2013), American literary scholar and Dostoevsky expert
Joe Frank (1938–2018), American radio personality
Joe Frank (politician)  (born 1942), American lawyer and former mayor of Newport News, Virginia
Joe Frank (American football) (1915–1981), member of the Philadelphia Eagles and Steagles

See also
Josef Frank (disambiguation)